A Quick One is the second studio album by the English rock band the Who, released on 9 December 1966. A version of the album with an altered track listing was released under the name Happy Jack on Decca Records in April 1967 in the United States, where the song "Happy Jack" was a top 40 hit.

Unlike other albums by the Who, where guitarist Pete Townshend was the primary or sole songwriter, A Quick One features significant songwriting contributions from all band members, with singer Roger Daltrey contributing one song, bassist John Entwistle and drummer Keith Moon each contributing two.  The album also included a cover of the Holland–Dozier–Holland song "Heat Wave" and ends with a musical suite titled "A Quick One, While He's Away", which served as an inspiration for later rock operas that the Who would become known for.

Composition and production
The Who's second studio album departs from the R&B emphasis of the first. Part of the marketing push for the album was a requirement that each band member should write at least two of the songs on it, though Roger Daltrey only wrote one ("See My Way"), so this is the Who album least dominated by Pete Townshend's songwriting. It was recorded at IBC Studios, Pye Studios, and Regent Sound in London England in 1966 by record producer Kit Lambert. Townshend said that this push for equal contribution led to the exclusion of the band's singles that he had written.

"Boris the Spider" was written after John Entwistle had been out drinking with the Rolling Stones' bass guitarist Bill Wyman. They were making up funny names for animals when Entwistle came up with the song. "Boris the Spider" quickly became Entwistle's most popular song, still performed decades later: in later years he often wore a spider necklace, and would have a spider web design inlaid on the body of his custom-made Alembic bass guitar (the latter is pictured on the cover of Entwistle's 1981 album Too Late the Hero).

Keith Moon's "I Need You" was originally titled "I Need You (Like I Need a Hole in the Head)". Moon thought the Beatles spoke in a secret language behind his back, and this song was his way of making fun of their northern accents. Although Moon denied that a vocal part in the song was a John Lennon imitation, Entwistle said that, in fact, it was.

John Entwistle would later cite "Whiskey Man" as the first song he ever wrote. It tells the story of a drunkard whose best friend is a man he sees only after drinking heavily. The drunkard is eventually locked in padded room in a sanitarium, and he laments not being able to share the room with Whiskey Man or even call him. In the first line of the song, Entwistle accidentally sings the word "friend" as "fwend"; not wanting to record an entirely new take, he instead opted to double-track the vocal and sing "flend" as a quick fix.

"Heat Wave", the only cover track and the only nod to the group's soul influences on the LP, was originally written by Tamla's Holland–Dozier–Holland team and performed by Martha and the Vandellas. It was replaced by "Happy Jack" on the original US release but later included on the 1974 double album repackaging of A Quick One and The Who Sell Out.

"Cobwebs and Strange" was originally called "Showbiz Sonata". Entwistle claimed that the melody came from the UK television series The Man from Interpol. Each band member played a wind instrument on the track: Townshend played the penny-whistle, Entwistle the trumpet and French horn, Daltrey the trombone, and Moon the tuba. They recorded the winds while marching around the studio.

"See My Way," Roger Daltrey's only writing contribution to the record, is a pastiche of Buddy Holly compositions. In order to achieve a deadened tom-tom sound like that of Crickets drummer Jerry Allison's distinctive paradiddles on "Peggy Sue," towels were placed on Moon's drum kit. When this resulted in a sound that didn't satisfy the band, Moon instead played the tom fills on cardboard boxes.

The mod/pop number "So Sad About Us", according to AllMusic, is "one of the Who's most covered songs". The Merseys, Shaun Cassidy, Primal Scream, the Breeders, Daytona, and the Jam have recorded studio versions.

"A Quick One, While He's Away" is a nine-minute suite of song snippets telling a story of infidelity and reconciliation, the first foray into an extended form that led to the rock operas Tommy and Quadrophenia.

Cover art
The album was intended to be pop music, a sonic participant in the pop art movement. The cover was designed by the pop art exponent Alan Aldridge, with the front cover depicting the band playing their instruments, as the titles of some songs from the album come out of the instruments in the form of onomatopoeiae: "Cobwebs and Strange" for Moon (top left), "Whiskey Man" for Entwistle (bottom left), "See My Way" for Daltrey (top right), and "A Quick One, While He's Away" for Townshend (bottom right). The back cover of the UK release is black, with the title and track listing across the top, and a colour head-shot photograph of each band member with the letters of "The W H O" superimposed individually over their faces. The back cover of the US release is a black-and-white photo montage of the band members accompanied by a short personality sketch of each (notorious among Who fans for Keith Moon's humorous assertion that he was keen on "breeding chickens"). A track listing, a couple of paragraphs touting the band, an ad for their first album, and a technical blurb are also crowded onto the back cover of the US release.

Critical reception

Rolling Stones Steve Appleford said in 1995 that the album's cheerful pop style has an authentic quality with trifles like "Cobwebs and Strange" that are reconciled by "absolutely perfect, poignant pop tune[s]" such as "So Sad About Us". The album was later described as "fascinatingly quirky" by the magazine.
In Christgau's Record Guide: Rock Albums of the Seventies (1981), Robert Christgau included the album's American version in his "basic record library". Rolling Stone ranked the album #383 on its list of the 500 greatest albums of all time, published in 2003, and #384 in 2012.

Track listing

A Quick One

 The mono version fades out sooner, giving it a total running time of 2:33.

Happy Jack

Personnel
The Who
Roger Daltrey – lead vocals, trombone on "Cobwebs and Strange"
Pete Townshend – guitar, backing vocals, co-lead vocals on "A Quick One, While He's Away", tin whistle on "Cobwebs and Strange"
John Entwistle – bass, backing vocals, lead vocals on "Boris the Spider" and "Whiskey Man", co-lead vocals on "A Quick One, While He’s Away", French horn and trumpet on "Cobwebs and Strange"
Keith Moon – drums, backing vocals, lead vocals on "I Need You", tuba on "Cobwebs and Strange"

A Quick One personnel
Chris Stamp – executive producer

1995 credits
Design [original vinyl sleeve]: Alan Aldridge
Design, Art Direction: Richard Evans
Executive-Producer: Bill Curbishley, Chris Charlesworth, Robert Rosenberg
Liner notes: Chris Stamp
Producer: Jon Astley
Producer [original recording]: Kit Lambert
Remix, remastered by: Andy Macpherson, Jon Astley

Charts

See also
Album era
British invasion
British rock
Pop art
Swinging London

References

 
 A Quick One: 1995 reissue insert (MCAD-11267).

External links
 
A Quick One liner notes – Song-by-song liner notes for the album
Guitar tablature

1966 albums
Reaction Records albums
Albums produced by Kit Lambert
The Who albums
Polydor Records albums
Decca Records albums
MCA Records albums
Albums with cover art by Alan Aldridge
Albums recorded at IBC Studios